The fine-banded woodpecker (Campethera taeniolaema)  is a species of bird in the family Picidae.
It is found from eastern Congo to Kenya and Tanzania.

References

 

fine-banded woodpecker
Birds of Central Africa
fine-banded woodpecker